Roundhouse is an American comedy-variety television series that aired on Nickelodeon from 1992 through 1996.

Background
Roundhouse debuted as a part of the original SNICK lineup on Nickelodeon in 1992 and continued airing on the network through the end of 1996.

Buddy Sheffield, a former writer for In Living Color, and Rita Sheffield Hester created and produced the series.  Recording artist Benny Hester was the music producer as well as co-producer of the series.  They titled the show in reference to the roundhouses used by railroad companies to turn trains around and get them on the right track. This was in line with the show's theme song, in which the characters stated "we can go anywhere from here". In addition, the stage for the show mirrored the interior of a roundhouse.

Episode format
Each episode revolved around the Anyfamily and their problems in daily life. The half-hour show, taped in front of a visible live audience, was broken up into sketches, dance sequences, and musical performances by both cast members and the house band. After everything is resolved story-wise, a cast member (or everyone in the final episode) would yell the words "Reprise the Theme Song and Roll the Credits"; the cast then sang the opening theme a cappella in Southern Gospel style and closed the show with a dance number.
All music used on the show was written specifically for Roundhouse. Crystal Lewis and Shawn Daywalt were the principal vocalists for many of the songs in the first season. After Lewis left the series to pursue a career in Christian contemporary music, she was replaced by Lisa Vale, who in turn was replaced by Amy Ehrlich and Jennifer Cihi for Season 3. Natasha Pearce became the series' principal vocalist in Season 4, but Vale returned for the fourth season as well.

Cast
Bryan Anthony (Season 4)
Alfred Carr Jr.
Jennifer Cihi (Season 3)
John Crane
Mark David
Shawn Daywalt
Ivan Dudynsky
Micki Duran
Amy Ehrlich (Season 3)
Seymour Willis Green
Crystal Lewis (Season 1)
Dominic Lucero (Seasons 1 and 3)
Shawn Muñoz (Season 3)
David Nicoll (Season 4)
Natalie Nucci
Natasha Pearce (Season 4)
Julene Renee-Preciado (as "Julene Renee")
David Sidoni
Lisa Vale (Seasons 2 and 4)

Death of Dominic Lucero
Following the show's first season, cast member Dominic Lucero was diagnosed with lymphoma and left the show for treatment, later returning for three episodes in the show's third season. Lucero died during production of the fourth season on July 1, 1994, at the age of 26. The series finale was dedicated in his memory (opening with "This one's for our friend Dominic, who couldn't be here"). At Lucero's request, his condition was not made public; the audience was unaware of his condition as a result. Despite his absence, Lucero's name and picture remained in the opening credits for the series' entire run.

Roundhouse band 

 Jack Kelly – drums
 John Pena – bass guitar
 James Raymond – keyboards
 Marty Walsh – guitar
 Will MacGregor – bass guitar (season 3)
 Abe Laboriel Jr. – drums (season 4)

Episodes

Season 1 (1992–93)
You Can’t Fire Your Family
New Kid in Town
Last One Picked
School Daze
First Date 
Crushes/Idealism
TV on Trial
Meat Market
The Clock Strikes Back 
Conflict 
Lifestyles 
The School Play
What If?

Season 2 (1993)
The Game of Popularity 
Environment
Pets
Step Family Feud 
In Trouble
Independence
Fears
Best Friends
And Baby Makes Three 
Summertime Blues 
Technobabble

Season 3 (1993–94)
Happy Holidays
Women vs. Men
Gang Violence
Jealousy
Talent
Rock Stars
Greed
Prejudice
Generation Gap
Puberty
Privacy
Self-Esteem
The Joke's on You
Running Away
Lies

Season 4 (1994–96)
The Big Quake
Summer Camp
Change
Nobody's Perfect (Live Episode)
Dropout
The History of the Anyfamily - Part I
The History of the Anyfamily - Part II
Justice
Superstitions
Stress and Success
Obsession
War & Peace
Endings

Sets
The first season was filmed on Stage 19 at Nickelodeon Studios in Universal Studios Florida, with the opening credits filmed in the New York section of the park.

The final 3 seasons were shot on Stage 4 at CBS Studio Center in Hollywood, California.

Awards and nominations

Syndication
YTV in Canada also aired the series during its initial run on Nickelodeon. After the show ceased production in 1994, reruns aired on both BET and MTV.  The TeenNick late-night block NickRewind sporadically reran the series beginning in 2015 as part of its initial rebrand as The Splat.

Home media
To date, two episodes have been released on VHS.

References

External links

Easychair Expressway - Fan Website
Episode Guide

1992 American television series debuts
1996 American television series endings
1990s American children's comedy television series
1990s American sketch comedy television series
1990s American variety television series
1990s Nickelodeon original programming
Children's sketch comedy
English-language television shows
Television shows directed by Bruce Gowers